Marie-Clotilde-Elisabeth Louise de Riquet (3 June 1837 – 8 November 1890) was a Belgian pianist. She was the eldest daughter of Michel Gabriel Alphonse Ferdinand de Riquet (1810–1865), created prince de Chimay 1834, for himself only, and Rosalie de Riquet de Caraman (1814–1872)

Life
In childhood she developed considerable aptitude as a pianist.  On 11 April 1860 she married Eugène Arnould Henri Charles François Marie, comte de Mercy-Argenteau (22 August  1838 – 2 May 1888).  She met Franz Liszt the next year. In 1866, she met emperor Napoleon III and befriended him. After his defeat at the Battle of Sedan, she visited him for a last time when he was a prisoner of the Prussians at Schloss Wilhelmshöhe and consoled him playing music. She later wrote a book about their four-year relationship, The Last Love of an Emperor.

In the early 1880s, she developed an interest in Russian music. This led to her studying the Russian language, translating some vocal music by several Russian composers, and arranging concerts and recitals of their music.  Her advocacy of music by The Mighty Handful favored that of César Cui and facilitated the production of the latter's opera Prisoner of the Caucasus in Liège in 1886.  Cui's collection of piano pieces entitled À Argenteau is a musical reminiscence of the count and countess' estate in Belgium.  La Comtesse de Mercy-Argenteau died of cancer on 8 November 1890 in Saint Petersburg, Russia.

Writings
César Cui: esquisse critique. Paris: Fischbacher, 1888.
The Last Love of an Emperor: reminiscences of the Comtesse Louise de Mercy-Argenteau, née Princesse de Caraman-Chimay, describing her association with the Emperor Napoléon III and the social and political part she played at the close of the Second Empire. Garden City, N.Y., Doubleday, Page & Co., 1926.

Notes

References
Bronne, Carlo.  La Comtesse de Mercy-Argenteau. 2nd ed. Liège:  Soledi, 1945.
Suttoni, Charles. "Liszt and Louise de Mercy-Argenteau," Journal of the American Liszt Society, v. 34 (1993), pp. 1–10.

External links
 

1837 births
1890 deaths
Belgian writers in French
Deaths from cancer in Russia
Belgian pianists
Belgian women pianists
Napoleon III
19th-century pianists
19th-century Belgian women musicians
19th-century women pianists